Keith Denson (born August 30, 1952) is a former American football wide receiver. He played for the Southern California Sun from 1974 to 1975 and for the New York Jets in 1976.

References

1952 births
Living people
American football wide receivers
San Diego State Aztecs football players
Southern California Sun players
New York Jets players